Stadionul Central is a multi-use stadium in Balotești, Romania. It is used mostly for football matches and is the home ground of CS Balotești. The stadium holds 3,780 people.

References

Football venues in Romania
Buildings and structures in Ilfov County